The Missoula Public Library is the public library of Missoula, Montana. The library provides free resources for residents and guests of Missoula County, Montana. A library card is free, and available, to all Montana residents.

Description
The Missoula Public Library opened in 1894. The Missoula Carnegie Library opened on Jan 13, 1903 on 335 N. Pattee St. and its building is now part of the Missoula Art Museum. The current site of the library's Main or Downtown Branch is 301 East Main (59802-4799), with two other book drop locations in Missoula and a branch at Big Sky High School. They have five other branches outside of Missoula. The library has served as a location for or been involved in community discussions.

The library provide free wireless internet access, a computer lab with over twenty stations, self-printing, two study rooms, a Makerspace, self-check out stations, self-hold pickup, and roving librarians. Their print and audio-visual collections include fiction, nonfiction, CDs, a Montana Collection in the Audra Browman Research Room, the Five Valleys Seed Library, Book Chat Bags, a Kids Readers' Corner, and a Young Adult Readers' Corner. They also check out laptops, DVD players, MonoMouses, life jackets, automotive diagnostic scanners, Ready to Read Trunks/Kids' Learning Kits, travel/trail bags, board games/puzzles, binoculars/birding backpacks, seeds, kill-a-watt meters, and telescopes. The library also has a coffee shop and public space where users can study or read with beverages or food. Other full-size libraries in Missoula include the Maureen and Mike Mansfield Library at the University of Montana.

Friends of Missoula Public Library has been active since 1969 and its current mission is to, "maintain a citizens' association devoted to libraries," to, "focus public attention on the Missoula Public Library and its branches and their needs," to, "increase their facilities and services," and to, "enrich the cultural lives of Missoula area citizens with community events and activities." The Missoula Book Fair was first held for the state centennial in 1989 and was continued because it, "increases awareness of local authors, promotes books and reading, and raises money for the Missoula Public Library."

Awards and honors
Librarians at the Missoula Public Library who have been given awards including being named the Sheila Cates Librarian of the Year by the Montana Library Association, as was current library director Honore Bray (2013), retired reference librarian Vaun Stevens (2009), former library director Bette Ammon (2002), and current cataloging librarian Paulette Parpart (2017).

In 2006 the Missoula Public Library, along with partner libraries Flathead County Library System, Heart Free Library, Bitterroot Public Library, Drummond School/Community Library, and Polson City Library, was awarded the Library of the Year Award by the Montana Library Association, and the Missoula Public Library was named Library of the Year in 1993.

See also
Billings Public Library
Bozeman Public Library
Great Falls Public Library

References

External links

"Support the Montana Book Award", MontanaBookAward.org.

1894 establishments in Montana
Buildings and structures in Missoula, Montana
County library systems in the United States
Education in Missoula County, Montana
Public libraries in Montana